This article contains a list of diplomatic missions in the Netherlands. There are currently 110 embassies in The Hague; many countries maintain consulates in other Dutch cities, notably Amsterdam and Rotterdam. Honorary consulates are not included in the list.

Diplomatic missions in The Hague

Representatives Offices in The Hague

Consulates General / Consulates

Amsterdam

Deventer

Oranjestad, Aruba

 (Consulate)

Philipsburg, Sint Maarten

Rotterdam

's-Hertogenbosch

Utrecht

Willemstad, Curaçao

 (Consulate)

 (Consulate)

Accredited embassies 
Resident in Brussels unless otherwise noted.

 (London)

 (London)

 

 (Bern)

 (London)

Former embassies

See also 
 Foreign relations of the Netherlands
 Visa requirements for Dutch citizens

Notes

References

External links 
 Dutch Ministry of Foreign Affairs

Diplomatic missions
Netherlands